The Derby of the North is a match between Dutch football clubs FC Groningen and SC Heerenveen. Since the dissolution of SC Veendam in 2013, there are only four professional football clubs in the three northern provinces of the Netherlands (Groningen, Friesland and Drenthe): FC Groningen, SC Heerenveen, SC Cambuur and FC Emmen. Although Heerenveen have an older and fiercer rivalry with Cambuur, the only game referred to as the Derby of the North is Groningen versus Heerenveen. This is due to Groningen and Heerenveen being seen as representing the provinces of Groningen and Friesland, whereas Cambuur is only regarded as the team of the city of Leeuwarden.

Groningen and Heerenveen have the biggest following of the four northern teams and are regulars in the first-tier Eredivisie. Cambuur have played in the Eerste Divisie, the second tier, for most of their existence. Emmen, Drenthe's only professional football team, made their debut in the Eredivisie in 2018–19. FC Groningen draws a lot of support from the provinces of Groningen and Drenthe.

History

Although FC Groningen and SC Heerenveen played each other for the first time in 1974, the rivalry did not commence until the mid-1990s. In the 1970s and 1980s, Groningen was the biggest and most successful football club in the northern provinces. Groningen were a regular in the first-tier Eredivisie, qualified several times for European football, and had the largest attendances in the Netherlands besides Ajax, Feyenoord and PSV. Heerenveen would not play in the Eredivisie until 1990–91. Only SC Veendam joined FC Groningen in the Eredivisie in two discontinuous seasons the 1980s but went straight back down on both occasions. As Groningen was the only Northern representative in the top flight, the Dutch media referred to the club as the "Pride of the North". Groningen's club anthem, written in the 1980s, mentions the people from the three northern provinces Groningen, Friesland and Drenthe being united in their support for Groningen.

During the early 1990s, Groningen began to decline and were relegated from the Eredivisie in 1997–98. Heerenveen won promotion to the Eredivisie in 1992–93 and started to climb up the Eredivisie table in subsequent years. The side finished second in the 1999–2000 Eredivisie and qualified for the Champions League. Groningen won promotion back to the top tier the same season.

Heerenveen, under the guidance of chairman Riemer van der Velde, were referred by the Dutch media as a "family club" and gained sympathy by embracing its Frisian identity; Heerenveen have modelled their kit after the Frisian flag and play the Frisian provincial anthem before every home match. In the early 21st century, the Dutch media referred to Heerenveen as "everybody's second favorite team". During the same era, Groningen's supporters clashed several times with fans of other clubs. Heerenveen began to brand itself as the "Pride of the North", which had been Groningen's nickname, as the club had surpassed Groningen in domestic results. The rivalry intensified, particularly from Groningen's side, whose supporters began to refer to their side as the "people's club" with a passionate following, while they regarded Heerenveen fans as "fairweather supporters" with the worst atmosphere in the league.

In early 2006, Groningen left their outdated Oosterparkstadion for the Euroborg, and the club's crowd troubles became a thing of the past. In their new stadium, Groningen began to close the gap and climbed up the league table. Around the same time, Heerenveen's "friendly image" began to attenuate.

List of results
Heerenveen have won the derby 29 times and Groningen have been victorious on 18 occasions. From a Groningen perspective it can be argued that the record balances in Heerenveen's favour because the two sides did not meet during Groningen's heyday in the 1980s, due to Heerenveen being in the second tier Eerste Divisie.

Both Groningen and Heerenveen celebrated the opening of their current stadium with a 2–0 victory. Heerenveen did so in the Abe Lenstra Stadion on 26 Augustus 1994; Groningen played their first official match in the Euroborg against Heerenveen on 13 January 2006. Groningen and Heerenveen have never met in the KNVB Cup or the play-offs.

References

FC Groningen
SC Heerenveen
Football derbies in the Netherlands